{{DISPLAYTITLE:C4H6N2O2}}
The molecular formula C4H6N2O2 may refer to:

 Cyanoalanine, an uncommon amino acid
 Dihydrouracil, an intermediate in the catabolism of uracil
 2,5-Diketopiperazine
 Ethyl diazoacetate, a reagent used in organic chemistry
 Muscimol, the major psychoactive alkaloid present in many mushrooms of the genus Amanita